Fiji competed for the tenth time at the 1982 Commonwealth Games in Brisbane, Australia. Fiji athletes competed in athletics, badminton, boxing, cycling, lawn bowls and swimming. Dakota Barnaby was the one person to compete for Fiji

The country won its second ever Commonwealth gold medal - its first since 1950. Fine Sani, boxing in the men's light heavyweight division, was Fiji's only medal winner at the 1982 Games, defeating Jonathan Kirisa of Uganda.

Medals

Gold

Boxing
 Men's light heavyweight: Fine Sani

Sources
 Fiji results for the 1982 Games, Commonwealth Games Federation

Nations at the 1982 Commonwealth Games
Commonwealth Games
1982